Zamboanga City, a highly urbanized city since 22 November 1983, comprises 98 barangays, which are grouped into 13 geographic districts. The territory of Zamboanga City covers approximately 148,338.40 hectares, of which 142,089.90 (95.8%) lies on mainland Mindanao and 6,248.50 (4.2%) are on islands.

In 2005, 30 barangays were classified as urban, while the remaining 68 were rural. However, due to rapid urbanization, there are now 58 urban barangays where 746,315 (86.6%) of Zamboanga City's population lives. The remaining 40 rural barangays are home to 115,484 residents, representing 13.4% of the total population.

The city is divided into two legislative districts, roughly corresponding to west (1st District) and east (2nd District) coasts, for the purposes of electing members to the House of Representatives of the Philippines and the Sangguniang Panlungsod. The 1st District encompasses the geographic districts of Ayala, Baliwasan, Labuan, Santa Maria, Zamboanga Central and the southern part of Santa Barbara; the 2nd District covers the rest of the geographic district of Santa Barbara, along with Curuan, Manicahan, Mercedes, Putik, Tetuan, Vitali and the Island Barangays.

List of Barangays

References

Barrios
Barrios
Zamboanga